(Cycloheptatrienyl)(cyclopentadienyl)vanadium is an organovanadium compound with the formula V(C5H5)(C7H7).  It is a purple, paramagnetic, sublimable solid that is sensitive toward air. The structure has been confirmed by X-ray crystallography. This sandwich complex features cyclopentadienyl and cycloheptatrienyl ligands bound to vanadium.  It was first prepared by heating a mixture of cycloheptatriene and cyclopentadienyl)vanadium tetracarbonyl.  Many derivatives of trovacene are prepared by lithiation of the cyclopentadienyl ring.

See also
(Cycloheptatrienyl)(cyclopentadienyl)titanium

References

Organovanadium compounds
Cyclopentadienyl complexes
Cycloheptatrienyl complexes
Sandwich compounds